9JKL is an American sitcom television series that was created and executive produced by Dana Klein and Mark Feuerstein, loosely based on the life of the couple, who are married in real life. The series debuted on October 2, 2017. It stars Feuerstein, Linda Lavin, David Walton, Elliott Gould, and Liza Lapira. On May 12, 2018, CBS cancelled the series after one season.

Premise
Josh Roberts, a divorced actor whose TV series was recently cancelled, moves back to New York City and lives in apartment 9K. His family lives in adjacent apartments: his parents live in 9J, while his brother, sister-in-law, and their newborn baby live in 9L. This unique situation prompts Josh to try and set boundaries while reconnecting with his family members.

The show is loosely based on Feuerstein's experiences while shooting the USA Network series Royal Pains; in real life, however, Feuerstein lived with his wife, 9JKL executive producer Dana Klein, while living next to his own family.

Cast

Main
 Mark Feuerstein as Josh Roberts
 Elliott Gould as Harry Roberts
 Linda Lavin as Judy Roberts
 Liza Lapira as Eve Roberts
 David Walton as Andrew Roberts
 Albert Tsai as Ian
 Matt Murray as Nick

Recurring
 Tone Bell as Luke

Guest stars
 Robert Costanzo as Massimo
 Brooke D'Orsay as Natalie 
 Paul Feig as himself
 Phil Morris as Dr. Starnes
 Christina Pickles as Lenore  
 Michael Showalter as Walter Michaelson 
 Lois Smith as Wrong Nana
 Fred Willard as Dick
 Cheri Oteri as Patty Partridge

Episodes

Production

Development 
On January 17, 2017, it was announced that CBS had given the production a pilot order as 9J, 9K and 9L. The episode was written and authored by Mark Feuerstein who was expected to executive produce along with Dana Klein, Aaron Kaplan, Wendi Trilling and Dana Honor. Production companies involved with the pilot include Liscolaide Productions, Trill TV, Kapital Entertainment, and CBS Television Studios. On May 12, 2017, CBS officially ordered the pilot to series. A few days later, it was announced that the series, now titled 9JKL, would premiere on October 2, 2017 and airs on Mondays at 9:30 P.M. On November 17, 2017, CBS picked up the series for a full season of 16 episodes.

Casting 
In February 2017, it was announced that David Walton, Matt Murray and Liza Lapira had been cast in the pilot's lead roles. On March 6, 2017, it was reported that both Linda Lavin and Elliott Gould had also joined the pilot's main cast. On June 19, 2017, it was announced that Albert Tsai had been cast to the regular series.

Cancellation 
On May 12, 2018, it was announced that CBS officially cancelled 9JKL, along with Kevin Can Wait, Superior Donuts, Living Biblically, and Me, Myself & I. A combination of factors, including declining ratings, CBS's desire to have an ownership stake, and the network needing to clear space for three new sitcoms in the fall 2018 schedule, led to the show's demise.

Home media
The full complete series was released on DVD as for CBS Home Entertainment on November 26, 2019.

Reception
The review aggregator website Rotten Tomatoes reported an approval rating of 19% based on 16 reviews. The website’s consensus reads: " Irritatingly uninspired, 9jkl leaves its talented cast out in the cold." Metacritic, which uses a weighted average, assigned a score of 37 out of 100 based on 10 critics, indicating "generally unfavorable reviews".

References

External links

2010s American sitcoms
2017 American television series debuts
2018 American television series endings
CBS original programming
English-language television shows
Television series by CBS Studios
Television shows set in New York City
Television series about dysfunctional families
Television series by Kapital Entertainment